The following lists events that happened during 2014 in the Democratic Republic of the Congo.

Incumbents 
 President: Joseph Kabila
 Prime Minister: Augustin Matata Ponyo

Events

April
 April 23 - More than 60 people are killed and 80 are seriously injured in a train crash in Katanga Province.

June
 June 7 - At least 37 people are killed in an attack in South Kivu province.
 June 8 - The United Nations and Military of the Democratic Republic of the Congo sends troops to South Kivu province after 37 people are killed there.

August
 August 24 - The Democratic Republic of Congo confirms two deaths from Ebola in the north of the country, the first cases reported from the current outbreak in West Africa.

October
 October 18 - Suspected Ugandan rebels kill more than 20 people near Beni in their second attack in 48 hours.

November
 November 20 - The Ugandan rebel group kills up to 80 people near Beni in North Kivu.

December
 December 7 - Ugandan rebels from the Allied Democratic Forces and National Army for the Liberation of Uganda kill 36 people in North Kivu province.
 December 12 - The ferry MV Mutambala capsizes on Lake Tanganyika, leaving at least 26 dead.
 December 14 - The death toll of a capsized ferry MV Mutambala on December 12 in Lake Tanganyika rises to 129 with authorities continuing to search for bodies or survivors.

References

 
Years of the 21st century in the Democratic Republic of the Congo
2010s in the Democratic Republic of the Congo
Democratic Republic of the Congo
Democratic Republic of the Congo